Relau is a residential neighbourhood located  southwest of the centre of George Town, the capital city of the Malaysian state of Penang.

Etymology 
Relau is believed to be named after charcoal kilns (Malay: relau) that had been built within the area.

History 
One of the major landmarks in Relau is the abandoned Chung Thye Phin Villa, which was formerly the summer residence of Chung Thye Phin, a local tycoon. Chung, the fourth son of Chung Keng Quee, served as the last Chinese Kapitan of Perak and by the time of his passing in 1935, was said to be the wealthiest man on Penang Island.

For much of its history, Relau was an agricultural area, until its eventual development into a housing estate in the 1980s.

Transportation 
Paya Terubong Road, which links Relau with the Paya Terubong suburb to the north and the town of Balik Pulau to the west, serves as the main thoroughfare within the neighbourhood.

Rapid Penang bus routes 301 and 306 include stops within Relau, thus connecting the neighbourhood with George Town proper, Queensbay Mall, and the Air Itam and Paya Terubong suburbs.

Education 
There are two primary schools and an international school within the neighbourhood of Relau.

Primary schools
 SRK Seri Relau
 SRJK (C) Min Sin
International school
 Fairview International School

Sports 
The Relau City Sports Complex, launched in 2017, is the first GBI-certified sports complex in Penang. The  sports complex is equipped with swimming and diving pools, badminton courts, a gymnasium and a dry gym, as well as bicycle parking bays.

Opened in 2003, the Relau Metropolitan Park is the second largest recreational park within Penang Island. Managed by the Penang Island City Council, the park was launched to cater to residents within the southern part of the island, as there had been a lack of recreational amenities within the area in the past.

References

Neighbourhoods in George Town, Penang